Kuwait is an emirate with a political system consisting of an appointed judiciary, appointed government (dominated by the Al Sabah ruling family), and nominally elected parliament.

Executive branch
The Constitution of Kuwait was approved and promulgated on 17 November 1962.

Government

The prime minister chooses the cabinet of ministers, which form the government. The prime minister is a member of the ruling family and is appointed by the Emir.

Emir
The Emir's powers are defined by the 1961 constitution. These powers include appointing the prime minister, who in turn chooses the cabinet of ministers (government). Upon the death of the Emir, the crown prince succeeds.

Judicial branch

The judiciary in Kuwait is not independent of the government, the Emir appoints all the judges and many judges are foreign nationals from Egypt. In each administrative district of Kuwait, there is a Summary Court (also called Courts of First Instance which are composed of one or more divisions, like a Traffic Court or an Administrative Court); then there is Court of Appeals; Cassation Court, and lastly - a Constitutional Court which interprets the constitution and deals with disputes related to the constitutionality of laws. Kuwait has a civil law legal system.

Legislative branch

The National Assembly is the legislature in Kuwait, established in 1963. Its predecessor, the 1938 National Assembly was formally dissolved in 1939 after "one member, Sulaiman al-Adasani, in possession of a letter, signed by other Assembly members, addressed to Iraq's King Ghazi, requesting Kuwait's immediate incorporation into Iraq". This demand came after the merchant members of the Assembly attempted to extract oil money from Ahmad Al-Jaber Al-Sabah, a suggestion refused by him and upon which he instigated a crackdown which arrested the Assembly members in 1939.

The National Assembly can have up to 50 MPs. Deputies are elected by one non-transferable vote to serve four-year terms. Members of the cabinet also sit in the parliament as deputies. The constitution limits the size of the cabinet to 16. The cabinet ministers have the same rights as the elected MPs, with the following two exceptions: they do not participate in the work of committees, and they cannot vote when an interpolation leads to a no-confidence vote against one of the cabinet members. In 2001, The George Washington University's Nathan J. Brown claimed Kuwait's National Assembly is the most independent parliament in the Arab world; in 2009, Israeli scholar Eran Segal claimed it is among the "strongest" parliaments in the Middle East.

Gulf War
During the 1990-1991 Gulf War, Saddam Hussein attempted to make Kuwait the 19th province of Iraq (known as Kuwait Governorate). During the Iraqi occupation, Ali Hassan al-Majid became the governor and took over what was left of the original government.

VIP Flight

The State of Kuwait operates several VIP jets used mainly by the Amir of Kuwait:

 1 Airbus A319-100 ACJ
 1 Airbus A320-200
 2 Airbus A340-500
 1 Boeing 737-900ER
 1 Boeing 747-8	
 4 Gulfstream Aerospace 

 

es:Gobierno y política de Kuwait
he:פוליטיקה של כווית
pt:Política do Kuwait